The logothetēs tōn oikeiakōn, originally the epi tōn oikeiakōn was a Byzantine official with varying duties.

The position of a head of this class (epi tōn oikeiakōn means "in charge of the oikeiakoi") appeared possibly in the 10th century, based on sigillographic evidence, or at any rate before circa 1030. His exact functions are unclear: Rodolphe Guilland considered him the successor of the epi tou eidikou as the head of the imperial private treasury, while Nicolas Oikonomides thought that he administered the Byzantine emperor's private domains. The post was often combined with other positions, and fulfilled a range of judicial and fiscal duties. In the Palaiologan period, it became the logothetēs tōn oikeiakōn, who exercised mainly diplomatic and judicial duties. According to the Book of Offices of pseudo-Kodinos, compiled around the middle of the 14th century, the logothetēs tōn oikeiakōn occupied the 39th place in the imperial hierarchy, between the praitōr tou dēmou and the megas logariastēs, but held no official function. His court uniform consisted of a turban (phakeōlis) and an overcoat called epilourikon.

See also
Protovestiarios

References

Sources
 
 
 

Byzantine fiscal offices
Foreign relations of the Byzantine Empire
Logothetai ton oikeiakon